Nick Cearley is an American actor, musician, singer, and dancer. A Fairfield, Ohio native, Cearley received his BFA from the Boston Conservatory for Musical Theatre with an emphasis in acting. He currently resides in New York City. Best known as one half of the critically acclaimed Indie-Pop Duo, The Skivvies. OUT Magazine selected Cearley on its OUT 100 List of 2014 as one of the most intriguing and compelling LGBT Actors of the year. He has performed in several shows such as in the 1st National Tour of All Shook Up, Buyer and Cellar at Bucks County, The Rocky Horror Show, and Sex Tips for Straight Women from a Gay Man Off-Broadway. Cearley most recently performed as Seymour in the Cincinnati Playhouse in the Park production of Little Shop Of Horrors.

See also
 The Skivvies

References

External links
 Official Site
 Skivvies Official Site

Year of birth missing (living people)
Living people
Male actors from Ohio
People from Fairfield, Ohio
Male actors from New York City